"Epic Fail" is the third episode of the sixth season of House. It first aired on September 28, 2009.

Plot
On returning from rehab, House walks into Cuddy's office and quits. When he reports to Dr. Nolan, his psychiatrist, that his leg pain has returned, Nolan suggests that House take up a hobby that can channel his focus.  House decides to learn how to cook.  He joins Wilson in a cooking class.  With House no longer in charge, Foreman wants to run the diagnostic department and Cuddy allows him a chance to do it. Foreman settles in House's office, and discusses Vince's case with Taub and Thirteen.

Foreman plans to treat him for complex regional pain syndrome with a spinal stimulation. But Vince has looked up his symptoms on the Internet, and thinks he has mercury poisoning. Ignoring Foreman's orders, Thirteen and Taub perform the test for mercury and not the spinal stimulation. Despite Foreman saying his mercury test was negative, Vince demands treatment for the mercury but Foreman challenges him. As Taub and Thirteen administer the spinal stimulation, Vince's lungs begin filling with fluid. A thickened left ventricle in his heart is causing pulmonary edema. Taub suspects cocaine use. Foreman admits to Thirteen that he has been comparing himself to House. Taub and Thirteen go search Vince's office.

As Taub and Thirteen play SavageScape at the developer's office, she complains that Foreman told her that he made a dinner reservation rather than asking her. Thirteen realizes that Vince, in researching the birds in the video game, may have caught an avian-related disease. Later, Thirteen discovers that Vince has had a three-hour erection. The doctors implant a stent for the priapism. Thirteen suggests a brain tumor but Foreman overrules her with a diagnosis of thrombocytosis. Taub agrees with Foreman. Thirteen and Foreman are arguing about the new dynamic in their relationship when they see unknown doctors in the patient's room.

Cuddy visits House at Wilson's apartment. He is cooking with a Chinese classmate and they talk about Cuddy in Chinese. Cuddy wants to know if she is the reason that House left the hospital, and he tells her no.  House later decides to give up cooking because his leg pain returns. He confides to Dr. Nolan that he's afraid of turning back to Vicodin.

Later, House goes back to his apartment and finds a bottle of Vicodin that he had stashed away. Wilson later finds House feeling much better, which worries him. Wilson shares his concerns with Cuddy. He tells her that he had House's urine tested and it came back clean because it was from a dog. Wilson and Cuddy confront House. To prove he is clean, he urinates in their presence.

Vince posts his symptoms on the internet. Doctors of highly different levels of skill come in to diagnose him. Before Foreman kicks them out, one doctor suggests a brain tumor. Thirteen tries to be diplomatic by saying that the diagnosis of both Foreman and the other doctor have merits. Foreman is angry that Thirteen did not completely back him up. Vince's MRI comes out clean, so Foreman orders Thirteen to treat for thrombocytosis.

Thirteen complains to House, who has been expecting her to visit because he predicted that tensions would occur in her relationship with Foreman, now that he's in power. He tells her to give in to Foreman to save their relationship. Foreman apologizes to Thirteen and they make up. However, Vince's lymph nodes swell up. Foreman was wrong about thrombocytosis. Vince offers a $25,000 reward for an answer online. The team is swamped by suggestions sent in from the public. Vince decides to go with the majority diagnosis and demands to be tested for amyloidosis. Foreman makes a deal with him: Foreman will test for amyloidosis, but if the test result is negative then Vince must cease requesting help on the internet.

Meanwhile, Taub quits, having received a recommendation from a friend to start a surgical practice. Foreman doesn't understand this move as he's holding up the diagnostics department so Taub and Thirteen can keep their jobs. Taub explains he came here to work because of House, not the department. Foreman is discouraged and turns to Thirteen for support.

The test results show deposits in the renal endothelium consistent with amyloidosis. Vince hallucinates that he is in the world of the video game, and spikes a fever. Thirteen and Foreman discuss the diagnosis while Vince is in a cold tub. Thirteen wants to turn to the internet theories but Foreman thinks Vince has light-chain deposition disease (LCDD), which can be treated with chemotherapy. Later, Foreman takes a shower and notices his pruned fingers in the locker room. He rushes to stop the chemotherapy.

Vince's fingers did not prune up after being in the bathtub for an hour. This is a symptom of Fabry disease. Thirteen also came to this conclusion based on iodine mumps, which came from an Internet suggestion. Thirteen comes to see Foreman in House's office. He is angry, but he needs her love and does not want their jobs to come between them. Because of this conflict, Foreman fires Thirteen.

House shows up at Dr. Nolan's office with a check for $25,000—he was the one who had solved Vince's case online. House tells Nolan that when he began diagnosing cases, the pain in his leg stopped. Nolan thinks it is best for House to return to diagnostic medicine in order to save him from his addiction.

Reception
Zack Handlen of The A.V. Club graded the episode a B.

References

External links
 

House (season 6) episodes
2009 American television episodes

it:Episodi di Dr. House - Medical Division (sesta stagione)#Fallimento epico